Lurdes de Maria Lima Pires dos Santos was a São Toméan politician. She was one of the first group of female members of the National Assembly in 1975.

Biography
In December 1975 she was appointed to the National Assembly as one of the first group of six women in the legislature.

References

São Tomé and Príncipe women in politics
Members of the National Assembly (São Tomé and Príncipe)
Movement for the Liberation of São Tomé and Príncipe/Social Democratic Party politicians
Living people
20th-century São Tomé and Príncipe politicians
20th-century women politicians
1955 births